High School for Arts and Business is a public high school in New York City, in Corona in the borough of Queens. The school once belonged to the Andrew Jackson High System and was named as an offsite section in 1973.

Facilities
HSAB's building was previously a bowling alley. It was first used as a school on February 1, 1973 when it became the Jackson High School Annex.

Extracurricular activities

References

External links 
High School for Arts and Business website

Educational institutions established in 1997
Public high schools in Queens, New York
Corona, Queens
1997 establishments in New York City